Carex hoodii is a species of sedge known by the common name Hood's sedge. It is native to western North America from Alaska to Nunavut to California to South Dakota, where it grows in dry to moist habitat in forests and on mountain slopes.

Description
Carex hoodii produces clumps of very thin stems up to about 80 centimeters in height. The leaves are narrow and possess a tight, green sheath at the base. The inflorescence is a dense cluster of spikelets 1-2 centimeters long. The flowers have reddish scales with light edges. The fruit is coated in a perigynium which is brown in the center and green around the edges, and may have a notched tip.

References

External links
Jepson Manual Treatment - Carex hoodii
USDA Plants Profile: Carex hoodii
Flora of North America
Carex hoodii - Photo gallery

hoodii
Flora of Western Canada
Flora of the Western United States
Flora of the Sierra Nevada (United States)
Flora of California
Flora of British Columbia
Flora of Alaska
Flora of Nunavut
Flora of the West Coast of the United States
Flora of South Dakota
Plants described in 1839
Flora without expected TNC conservation status